Alexander Koch (born 22 February 1969) is a German fencer. He won a gold medal in the team foil event at the 1992 Summer Olympics.

References

External links
 

1969 births
Living people
German male fencers
Olympic fencers of Germany
Fencers at the 1992 Summer Olympics
Fencers at the 1996 Summer Olympics
Olympic gold medalists for Germany
Olympic medalists in fencing
Sportspeople from Bonn
Medalists at the 1992 Summer Olympics
Universiade medalists in fencing
Universiade silver medalists for Germany
20th-century German people